Salient Peak is a buttressed peak of the Royal Society Range between Mounts Rucker and Hooker. A ridge descends eastward from it and forms the watershed between tributaries of the Blue Glacier on the north and Walcott Glacier on the south. So named by the New Zealand Blue Glacier Party of the Commonwealth Trans-Antarctic Expedition (1956–58) because it forms a salient of the Royal Society Range, where the summit turns southwest toward Mounts Rucker and Huggins.

Mountains of Victoria Land
Scott Coast